Different conventions exist around the world for date and time representation, both written and spoken.

Differences 

Differences can exist in:
The calendar that is used.
The order in which the year, month, and day are represented. (Year-month-day, day-month-year, and month-day-year are the common combinations.)
How weeks are identified (see seven-day week)
Whether written months are identified by name, by number (1–12), or by Roman numeral (I-XII). 
Whether the 24-hour clock, 12-hour clock or 6-hour clock is used.
Whether the minutes (or fraction of an hour) after the previous hour or until the following hour is used in spoken language.
The punctuation used to separate elements in all-numeric dates and times.
Which days are considered the weekend.

ISO 8601 

International standard ISO 8601 (Representation of dates and times) defines unambiguous written all-numeric big-endian formats for dates, such as 2022-12-31 for 31 December 2022, and time, such as 23:59:58 for 23 hours, 59 minutes, and 58 seconds.

These standard notations have been adopted by many countries as a national standard, e.g., BS EN 28601 in the UK and similarly in other EU countries, ANSI INCITS 30-1997 (R2008), and FIPS PUB 4–2 in the United States (FIPS PUB 4-2 withdrawn in United States). They are, in particular, increasingly widely used in computer applications, since the most to least significant digit order provides a simple method to order and sort time readings.

Local conventions

Date

The little-endian format (day, month, year; 1 June 2022) is the most popular format worldwide, followed by the big-endian format (year, month, day; 2006 June 1). Dates may be written partly in Roman numerals (i.e. the month) or written out partly or completely in words in the local language.

Time
The 24-hour clock enjoys broad everyday usage in most non-English speaking countries, at least when time is written or displayed. In some regions, for example where German, French, and Romanian are spoken, the 24-hour clock can be used even when speaking casually, while in other countries the 12-hour clock is used more often in spoken form.

In most English-speaking regions, particularly the United States and the Commonwealth, the 12-hour clock is the predominant form of stating the time, with the 24-hour clock used in contexts where unambiguity and accurate timekeeping are important, such as for public transport schedules. Nonetheless, usage is inconsistent: in the UK, train timetables will typically use 24-hour time, but road signs indicating time restrictions (e.g. on bus lanes) typically use 12-hour time, e.g. "Monday–Friday 6.30–8.30pm". The BBC website uses the 24-hour clock for its TV and radio programme listings, while BBC promotions for upcoming programmes give their times according to the 12-hour clock.  Punctuation and spacing styles differ, even within English-speaking countries (6:30 p.m., 6:30 pm, 6:30 PM, 6.30pm, etc.).

Most people in "24-hour countries" are so used to both systems being alternatively used in spoken language that they have no problem switching between the two, perceiving the statements "three o'clock" and "15:00" simply as synonyms. When speaking, a person may often pronounce time in 12-hour notation, even when reading a 24-hour display. It is also common that a person uses the 24-hour clock in spoken language when referring to an exact point in time ("The train leaves at fourteen forty-five ..."), while using some variant of the 12-hour notation to refer vaguely to a time ("... so I will be back tonight some time after five."). In these countries, however, the abbreviations "a.m." and "p.m." are not in use. Encountering a p.m. time written in the 12-hour notation (e.g. 6:30 meaning 18:30) is likely to cause confusion with people used to the 24-hour written notation.

In certain languages such as Spanish, Portuguese, Dutch, and English the hour is divided into quarters and halves, spoken of relative to the closest hour. In Arabic, thirds of an hour are also used. (xx:20, xx:40)

In Czech quarters and halves always refer to the following hour, e.g. čtvrt na osm (quarter on eight) meaning 7:15, půl osmé (half of eight) meaning 7:30 and tři čtvrtě na osm (three-quarters on eight) meaning 7:45. This corresponds to the time between 7:00 and 8:00 being the eighth hour of the day (the first hour starting at midnight). Russian uses the same convention: четверть восьмого (quarter of the eighth hour), полвосьмого (half of eight), без четверти восемь (eight without a quarter) meaning 7:15, 7:30, 7:45 respectively.

In many Germanic languages, with the exception of English, the half-hour refers to the next hour (half to nine rather than half past eight). In colloquial language, this can cause confusion between English and German (and other Germanic languages). In conversational English as spoken in the UK, half past eight (for 8:30) is often reduced to half eight (whereas in the United States half past eight would always be used). But in German , Dutch , and Swedish , all invariably mean 7:30.

In many countries it is common in spoken language to refer to times in minutes or fractions of an hour relative to the following hour rather than the previous one for times after the 30 minute mark – eg 8:55 would be said as "five to nine", and 6:45 would be "quarter to seven".

In French, the quarters are expressed as additions or subtractions of the full hour:  (literally "seven hours and quarter"),  ("seven hours and half"),  ("eight hours less the quarter"). It's also common to use this format in Portuguese, specifically in the northern part of Portugal.

In France and Vietnam, the common separator between hours and minutes is the letter "h" (18h45, for example).

In Finland and Indonesia, the common separator between hours and minutes is a dot (18.45, for example).

See also
 Calendar date
 Common Locale Data Repository, a database that covers national date and time notations
 Date and time notation in Europe

References

 
Country
 Date and time